Cheshmeh Pahn is a village in Shamsabad Rural District, in the Central District of Arak County, Markazi Province, Iran. At the 2006 census, its population was 767, in 209 families.

References 

Populated places in Arak County